The Ocean Island massacre occurred on 20 August 1945 when between 150 and 200 civilians were killed in a mass execution by members of a Japanese naval garrison unit. The civilians, all originally inhabitants from other parts of the Gilbert Islands, had been brought to Ocean Island as slave labour. Perpetrated five days after the official Japanese announcement of surrender at the end of the Second World War, the nature of the massacre was only revealed four months later due to the emergence of a sole survivor, Kabunare Koura of Nikunau, who had remained in hiding until December 1945. Initially, the commander of the unit, Suzuki Naoomi, claimed that the civilian population had been killed during a rebellion, but the revelation of Kabunare's testimony and subsequent confessions from lower ranking participants led to war crimes prosecutions by the Australian military. In total, 21 Imperial Japanese Navy (IJN) personnel were convicted, of whom eight were executed, for their roles in the mass atrocity.

War crimes trials 

‡ On the recommendation of the Judge Advocate General, death sentence was commuted to a prison term of 20 years.

* Lieutenant-commander Suzuki's execution was delayed due to appearing as a witness in the trial of Major General Hirota Akira.

See also 
 Japanese occupation of the Gilbert Islands

 Japanese occupation of Nauru
Japanese war crimes

References

Footnotes

Sources

Kiribati in World War II
Gilbert Islands
Military history of the British Empire and Commonwealth in World War II
Banaba
World War II prisoner of war massacres
Murder in Kiribati
Japan–Kiribati relations
Massacres in 1945
Mass murder in 1945
Massacres in Oceania
Japanese Navy
1945 murders in Oceania